Stormålvatnet is a lake in the municipality of Hemnes in Nordland county, Norway. The river Bjerkaelva flows through the lake on its way to the nearby Ranfjord.

See also
 List of lakes in Norway
 Geography of Norway

References

Hemnes
Lakes of Nordland